Tourist Police is a special branch of the Bangladesh Police, responsible for investigating crimes against tourists and providing security in tourist areas. Additional IG Habibur Rahman is the chief of Tourist Police.

History
The unit was formed by the Government of Bangladesh, led by Prime Minister Sheikh Hasina. It was established in 2009, and has two divisions based in Chittagong and Dhaka. In February 2017, the unit launched a smart phone app, Hello Tourist, that contains relevant information for tourists in Bangladesh.

References

2009 establishments in Bangladesh
Law enforcement agencies of Bangladesh
Police units of Bangladesh
Tourism in Bangladesh